The Tempest, also known as The Tempest (Prospero and Miranda), or simply Prospero and Miranda, is an outdoor bronze sculpture depicting Prospero and Miranda from William Shakespeare's The Tempest by Milton Hebald, installed outside Delacorte Theater in Manhattan's Central Park, in the U.S. state of New York. The work, which was donated by George T. Delacorte, Jr. and unveiled in 1966, is a companion piece to Romeo and Juliet (1977).

See also

 1966 in art

References

1966 establishments in New York City
1966 sculptures
Bronze sculptures in Central Park
Outdoor sculptures in Manhattan
Sculptures in Central Park
Sculptures of men in New York City
Sculptures of women in New York City
Statues in New York City
Statues of fictional characters
Works based on The Tempest